Eli Wilner (born 1956) is an American businessman specializing in American and European period frames from the 19th through the early 20th century. He is a frame dealer, collector, and restorer.

Career
Wilner is a graduate of Brandeis University, where he received a BA in Fine Arts in 1976, and of Hunter College, where he received his MA in 1978.  He was a Bryant Fellow at the Metropolitan Museum of Art from 1995 to 1999.  He has been an Art Forum member since 1993 and a member of the Director's Circle of the Smithsonian American Art Museum since 1997.  In 1998, Wilner served on the board of trustees for the New York Academy of Art.

In 1983, Eli Wilner founded Eli Wilner & Company, an art gallery located on New York's Upper East Side dedicated to the display and sale of American and European frames.

The company has worked with the White House, reframing over two-dozen American paintings from the collection.  In addition, Eli Wilner & Company has worked with some of the nation's museums, including the Metropolitan Museum of Art and the Smithsonian American Art Museum as well as leading auction houses Sotheby's and Christie's.

Books
 The Gilded Edge Revised Edition: The Art of the Frame (2011)
 The Gilded Edge: The Art of the Frame (2000)
 Antique American Frames: Identification and Price Guide 2nd Edition (1999) (with Mervyn Kaufman)
 Antique American Frames: Identification and Price Guide (1995) (with Mervyn Kaufman)
 The Art of the Frame: American Frames of the Arts and Crafts Period (1988)

References

External links
 Eli Wilner & Company's website
 
 Ask Martha: Frames, from the Martha Stewart Living website

1956 births
Living people
American art dealers
American art collectors
Brandeis University alumni
Hunter College alumni